Jimmy Dunn (born ) is an American stand-up comedian and actor. According to The Portsmouth Herald, he is known for his portrayal of the "big, loud, dumb guy". In 2014, he was cast in the CBS sitcom The McCarthys. He grew up in Beverly, Massachusetts, and attributed his role in the show in part to his Boston roots, where the show is set. Other factors include his experience in playing "chubby and dim" characters, which he described as his main strength. He currently resides in Hampton, New Hampshire.

Filmography
Mint Condition (2001) - Muscle Car Guy
Stuck on You (2003) - Beverly Hills Police Jailbird
Partners (2013) - Duffy
The McCarthys (2014–2015) - Sean McCarthy
Entertainment Tonight (2014) - Himself
The Talk (2014) - Himself
Quiet on the Set (2014) - Himself
TMI Hollywood (2017) - Host, Various
Love (2018)

References

External links
 
 

Living people
People from Beverly, Massachusetts
Comedians from Massachusetts
Male actors from Massachusetts
American male comedians
Year of birth missing (living people)